Atrolysin F (Crotalus atrox metalloendopeptidase, hemorrhagic toxin f, Crotalus atrox metalloendopeptidase f) is an enzyme. This enzyme catalyses the following chemical reaction

 Cleavage of Val2-Asn, Gln4-His, Leu6-Cys, His10-Leu, Ala14-Leu and Tyr16-Leu bonds in insulin B chain

This endopeptidase is present in the venom of the western diamondback rattlesnake (Crotalus atrox).

References

External links 
 

EC 3.4.24